Gino Mäder (born 4 January 1997) is a Swiss road and track cyclist, who currently rides for UCI WorldTeam .

Career
Before turning professional on the road, Mäder was a high level track cyclist, having competed at the 2016 UEC European Track Championships in the team pursuit event.
He turned fully professional in 2019, with UCI WorldTeam .
In October 2020, he was named in the startlist for the 2020 Vuelta a España.

On stage 7 of the 2021 Paris–Nice, Mäder was part of the breakaway, and nearly won the stage. However, in the final 50 meters, he was caught and outsprinted by Primož Roglič. He was given the combativity award for the day.

Later in the year, Mäder rode the 2021 Vuelta a España. After losing three minutes over the first eight stages, he began to perform strongly starting on stage nine, when he finished seventh on the mountain stage to Alto de Velefique. Over the rest of the race, he continued his strong performance while serving as a domestique for Jack Haig. On stage 17, which finished atop the Lagos de Covadonga, Mäder finished with the elite group that finished a minute and a half down on the race leader, Primož Roglič. The result lifted him inside the top ten on GC. On the race's penultimate stage, Mäder and Haig, together with Roglič, Enric Mas, and Adam Yates, comprised the five-man group that escaped from the GC group on the third to the last climb. The group continued to build their advantage over the other contenders, with the move allowing Mäder to rise inside the top five overall and Haig to move into the third spot on GC. Mäder also took the lead in the young rider classification as he overhauled Egan Bernal. He held his position in the final day time trial to finish the Vuelta in fifth and confirming his victory in the young rider classification.

Major results

2014
 4th Road race, UEC European Junior Road Championships
 9th Overall Grand Prix Rüebliland
 9th Overall Tour du Pays de Vaud
2015
 1st  Time trial, National Junior Road Championships
 2nd Overall Tour du Pays de Vaud
1st Prologue & Stage 1
 2nd Overall Grand Prix Rüebliland
 5th Time trial, UCI Junior Road World Championships
2017
 3rd Piccolo Giro di Lombardia
 6th Eschborn–Frankfurt U23
2018
 Tour Alsace
1st  Points classification
1st Stage 4
 1st Stage 4 Ronde de l'Isard
 2nd Time trial, National Under-23 Road Championships
 2nd Overall Tour of Hainan
1st Stage 6
 3rd Overall Tour de l'Avenir
1st Stages 8 & 10
 4th Road race, UCI Road World Under-23 Championships
 4th G.P. Palio del Recioto
2021
 Giro d'Italia
1st Stage 6 
Held  after Stages 6–8
 1st Stage 8 Tour de Suisse
 5th Overall Vuelta a España
1st  Young rider classification
 5th Time trial, National Road Championships
 10th Overall Paris–Nice
2022
 2nd Overall Tour de Romandie
2023
 5th Overall Paris–Nice

General classification results timeline

References

External links

1997 births
Living people
Swiss male cyclists
Swiss track cyclists
Place of birth missing (living people)
Swiss Giro d'Italia stage winners
Olympic cyclists of Switzerland
Cyclists at the 2020 Summer Olympics
Tour de Suisse stage winners
20th-century Swiss people
21st-century Swiss people